HD 65810 is a class A2V (white main-sequence) star in the constellation Puppis. Its apparent magnitude is 4.61 and it is approximately 241 light years away based on parallax.

References

Puppis
A-type main-sequence stars
BD-18 2118
039095
3131
065810